Four vessels of the British Royal Navy have been named HMS Victoria in honour of Queen Victoria:

 , a wooden paddle sloop launched in India in 1839 and sold in about 1864
 , a first rate screw ship broken up in 1893
 , a Coast Guard yawl, sold in 1905
 , a Victoria-class battleship sunk in a collision with HMS Camperdown in 1893 in the Mediterranean with the loss of 358 lives.

See also 
 , a submarine
 
 
 
 , two ships of the colonial navy of Victoria, Australia
 List of ships named HMY Victoria and Albert, three Royal Yachts
  also known as RMS Victoria
 Victoria (disambiguation)

Royal Navy ship names